Transcendence Into the Peripheral is the only studio album by Australian death-doom band Disembowelment. The album was originally released in 1993. In 2005, this album was included in its entirety as part of a double CD of all the band's recorded material.

Track listing

Credits

Disembowelment
 Renato Gallina - vocals, guitar
 Jason Kells - guitar
 Paul Mazziotta - drums
 Matthew Skarajew - bass

Additional Personnel
 Tony Mazziotta - double bass on "Cerulean Transience of All My Imagined Shores"
 I'da - vocals on "Nightside of Eden"

References

1993 debut albums
Disembowelment (band) albums